Parliamentary elections were held in Burundi on 18 September 1961 in order to install a government to rule the country following independence from Belgium on 1 July 1962. The result was a victory for the Union for National Progress, which won over 80% of the vote and 58 of the 64 seats in the National Assembly. Voter turnout was 75.39%.

Results

References

Elections in Burundi
1961 in Burundi
Burundi